Kropotkin Range is a mountain range in Okinsky District, Buryatia, Russian Federation.

Geography
The Kropotkin Range is part of the Eastern Sayan mountains. The Khoyto-Oka tributary of the Oka separates this range from the Oka Range (Окинский хребет) to the west and north. To the eastern side of the river rise the Belskye Goltsy (Бельские Гольцы). The confluence of the Khoyto-Oka and the Oka marks the northeastern limit of the range. 

The mountains display an Alpine relief.

See also
List of mountains and hills of Russia

References

External links
хребет Кропоткина - Nature Baikal (Pictures)
The Devonian magmatism in the Kropotkin Ridge (East Sayan) and sources of basites: geological, geochemical, and Sr-Nd isotope data

Mountain ranges of Russia
Mountains of Buryatia
Sayan Mountains

ceb:Khrebet Kropotkina (kabukiran sa Rusya, Respublika Buryatiya)